Zhang Guangping (born 18 July 1964) is a Chinese boxer. He competed in the men's bantamweight event at the 1992 Summer Olympics.

References

1964 births
Living people
Chinese male boxers
Olympic boxers of China
Boxers at the 1992 Summer Olympics
Place of birth missing (living people)
Bantamweight boxers